The 18th Biathlon World Championships were held in 1981 in Lahti, Finland.

Men's results

20 km individual

10 km sprint

4 × 7.5 km relay

Medal table

References

1981
Biathlon World Championships
International sports competitions hosted by Finland
1981 in Finnish sport
March 1981 sports events in Europe
Sports competitions in Lahti
Biathlon competitions in Finland